Ace Darl Loomis (June 12, 1928 – September 11, 2003) was a professional American football defensive back and a halfback in the National Football League who played for the Green Bay Packers.  Loomis was drafted in the fifth round of the 1951 NFL Draft out of the University of Wisconsin–La Crosse by the Cleveland Browns.  He played 3 years for the Packers and retired in 1953.

References

1928 births
2003 deaths
Sportspeople from Dubuque, Iowa
Players of American football from Iowa
American football defensive backs
American football halfbacks
Wisconsin–La Crosse Eagles football players
Green Bay Packers players